Pyramid G1-d (also known as 'G Id', 'G1d', or 'GId') is a satellite pyramid within the Khufu Pyramid complex on the Giza plateau. 

Superstructure 
Joseph Dorner established the mean slope to be about 51°45', very similar to that of the Great Pyramid. This equates to a Seked of 5 palms and 2 fingers, a ratio of 28 rise to 22 run.
The blocks that remained In situ surrounded the substructure in an U-shape. The bedrock below the pyramid slopes downward to the east and south, hence a layer of foundation stones was placed to form an even base.

One of the core blocks of the south side was inscribed in red paint on the inside surface. The notation says, "imy rsy S3." This graffiti, meaning "on the south [back] side," probably instructed the stone movers where to place the block.

Multiple casing blocks were found out of position, scattered around the pyramid.

No stones of the second course from the top remained, yet in 1993 the actual pyramidion was discovered accidentally north of the pyramid by assistant AlIa el-Din Shaat. Its underside is faceted, four triangles form a shallow downward pyramid. It is the second oldest capstone of a pyramid ever found, the earliest belonging to the Red Pyramid of Sneferu at Dahshur.

The top three courses were reconstructed by Miss Nivien Mohamed Mustafa four meters north of the pyramid. The foundation and parts of the first course of the pyramid was restored as well with newly carved limestone blocks.

Substructure 
The substructure consists of an inclined passage of 25-28° which runs north to south. It starts  from the pyramid's base line, indicating the original entrance lied somewhat above the ground level on the north face.

This two cubit wide corridor runs for a length of 10 cubits until it terminates in a chamber extending to the east and west,. Together they form a T-shaped structure that matches satellite pyramids subsequent to Khufu.

A distinct cutting in the bedrock indicates that the passage was once blocked by square stones.

Traces of mortar hint at a now missing pavement.

The walls of the chamber were not smoothed or polished and are slightly inclined, narrowing towards the no longer extant ceiling. Four small holes at the west-end suggest two crossing beams spanning the narrow side of the chamber. Hassan speculates they could have been intended for lowering or covering an object.

Purpose 
The purpose of the pyramid is under debate by scholars. Some possible explanations are that it is for the king's Ka, or it represents the king as the ruler of Upper Egypt, or it is for the viscera of the King, or it is a dummy room for the Sed festival, or it has a solar function. Zahi Hawass, who led the uncovering of the pyramid, believed that the satellite pyramid was used symbolically as a changing room for the Sed festival.

See also
Pyramid G1-a
Pyramid G1-b
Pyramid G1-c
 List of Egyptian pyramids

References

External links
 The discovery of the satellite Pyramid of Khufu 
 The discovery of the satellite Pyramid of Khufu
 The revised and complete article on the pyramidion of the satellite pyramid of Khufu, g1d
 Origins of Pyramid GI-d, Southeast of the Great Pyramid
 Keith Hamilton guides

Giza Plateau
Pyramids of the Fourth Dynasty of Egypt